Hans Munch or Hans Münch may refer to:

Hans Munch (bishop) (1664–1712), a Norwegian bishop
Hans Münch (1911–2001), a German SS physician, known for refusing to assist in the murders at Auschwitz in World War II
Hans Münch (conductor) (1893–1983), a Swiss conductor, composer, and musician
Hans Munch-Petersen (1869–1934), a Danish scholar

See also
Münch, a list of people with the surnames Münch, Munch, or Muench